Typhoon Keith was the tenth of a record eleven super typhoons to develop during the unusually intense 1997 Pacific typhoon season. Originating from a near-equatorial trough on October 26, the precursor depression to Keith slowly organized into a tropical storm. The following day, the powerful storm passed between Rota and Tinian in the Northern Mariana Islands. After fluctuating in strength over the following few days, a steady weakening trend established itself by November 5 as the typhoon accelerated towards the northeast. On October 8, Keith transitioned into an extratropical cyclone and was last noted early the following day near the International Dateline.

However, these winds resulted in significant damage across the island chain. More than 800 homes were damaged or destroyed by the storm and losses amounted to $15 million (1997 USD). There were no reports of fatalities in relation to the storm; however, one person was injured.

Meteorological history

Typhoon Keith originated during the third week of October 1997 from a near-equatorial trough near the Marshall Islands. Along with its Southern Hemisphere twin, convection persisted around a weak low-level circulation, beginning on October 18. Slowly tracking westward, the system remained fairly disorganized before conditions allowed it to develop. By October 26, convection consolidated around the center of circulation and symmetrical outflow became established over the storm. Later that day, the JTWC issued a Tropical Cyclone Formation Alert (TCFA) for the system as they anticipated development into a tropical cyclone. Hours later, the Japan Meteorological Agency (JMA) began monitoring the system as a tropical depression. Despite favorable conditions, the low initially failed to develop further, prompting the issuance of a second TCFA on October 27. Later that day, the JTWC issued their first advisory on the depression, classifying it as 29W.

Early on October 28, the depression intensified into a tropical storm, at which time it was named Keith by the JTWC. Tracking west-northwestward in response to a subtropical ridge, the storm slowly intensified at roughly half the rate initially forecast. Additionally, the barometric pressure decreased by 43 mbar (hPa; 1.27 inHg) during this time. Throughout the following day, the typhoon continued to intensify, becoming a super typhoon – a storm with winds of at least  – late on October 31.

After moving through the islands, Keith briefly weakened below super typhoon status on November 3 as the eye became partially obscured due to an eyewall replacement cyclone. However, it re-attained winds of  the following day as it began to turn towards the north and later northeast. Once the storm completed its turn, Keith accelerated and steadily weakened as it entered the westerly flow north of the ridge previously steering it westward. Early on October 8, the storm transitioned into an extratropical cyclone as it was downgraded to a tropical storm. The extratropical remnants of Keith were last noted by the JMA on October 9 near the International Dateline.

Impact

Prior to the storm's arrival, more than 1,000 residents evacuated to storm shelters set up in the Northern Marianas Islands. Women who were more than seven months pregnant were also urged to check into hospitals, as doctors warned that changes in pressure could trigger labor.

Despite the storm's close passage between both islands, the maximum sustained winds above  did not extend far enough out to reach either island.

Across the Northern Mariana Islands, more than 800 homes were damaged or destroyed and power was lost to most of the islands, leaving roughly 25,000 people without electricity. Most of the damage took place on Saipan, where 130 homes were destroyed, 436 had major damage, and 226 others received minor damage. On Rota, 24 homes were destroyed and 156 others were damaged to varying degrees. Despite the severity of damage, there were no reports of loss of life and only one injury in relation to the typhoon. Throughout the Northern Mariana Islands, monetary losses from Keith amounted to $15 million (1997 USD).

In the wake of the typhoon, President Bill Clinton declared the Mariana Islands as a disaster area, allowing the affected islands to receive government aid. Red Cross workers were deployed to the islands to assist with relief efforts days after the storm. Typhoon Keith was one of 23 events in the United States during the 1997-98 El Niño event which warranted federal aid; combined, the disasters cost $289.1 million, of which $5,813,784 was attributed to Keith.

In Japan, one person was killed in a high wave by Keith.

See also

Typhoon Isa
Typhoon Joan (1997)
Typhoon Dolphin (2015)
Typhoon Lekima (2013)

References

External links

JMA General Information of Typhoon Keith (9725) from Digital Typhoon
JMA Best Track Data (Graphics) of Typhoon Keith (9725)
JMA Best Track Data (Text)
JTWC Best Track Data of Super Typhoon 29W (Keith)
29W.KEITH from the U.S. Naval Research Laboratory

Kieth
Typhoons
Typhoons in Guam
Typhoons in the Northern Mariana Islands
October 1997 events
November 1997 events